Spark is a Canadian radio talk show about "technology and culture." Hosted by Nora Young, the program made its CBC Radio One début on September 5, 2007. The show is also broadcast on Sirius Satellite Radio 159 and, since January 9, 2010, on Vermont Public Radio's network of stations in the United States. It is also broadcast in Australia on the Australian Broadcasting Corporation's Radio National network. Spark is produced in Toronto by Young and a team that currently consists of Michelle Parise, Adam Killick, and Kent Hoffman.

The program is made collaboratively with its audience. Nora Young often encourages listeners to become "Spark Contributors" by participating in the active conversations on the Spark Blog, notifying the Spark Team of interesting ideas to investigate, or even recording interviews and letting Spark use them on the show. The show often plays phone messages left by Spark listeners and features comments left on the Spark Blog.  Its episodes made use of Creative Commons music until October 2010, when CBC management realized that Spark was available on some platforms considered to be commercial, violating use restrictions of most of the music available under the Creative Commons licenses. This prompted Spark to limit its use to the APM Music library.

Spark sometimes comments on proposed legislation that affects widely used technology. An example was the Copyright Modernization Act and the bills leading up to it.

Producers
In addition to Nora Young, current producers include Michelle Parise, Adam Killick, and Kent Hoffman. Past producers include Dan Misener, Elizabeth Bowie and Carma Jolly.

Multiple podcasts
The on-air version is available as a weekly podcast, augmented with two additional audio feeds: Spark Plus (which features "bonus audio" such as full interviews), and "Bandwidth with Anshuman Iddamsetty", a weekly technology column by one of Spark's producers.

Spark Lite, a low-bandwidth podcast of the on-air version powered by blip.tv, was available from November 2008 to October 2011; it ended due to changes in blip.tv policy.

References

External links
 Official website

CBC Radio One programs
Audio podcasts
Canadian talk radio programs
2007 radio programme debuts